The 2009 IFSC Climbing World Championships, the 10th edition, were held in Xining, Qinghai, China from 30 June to 5 July 2009.

The competitions were held for lead, bouldering, and speed (10m and 15m).

Medal winners overview

Lead

Men 
78 athletes attended the men's lead competition.

Women 
50 athletes attended the women's lead competition.

Bouldering

Men 
69 athletes attended the men's bouldering competition.

Women 
51 athletes attended the women's bouldering competition.

Speed 10m

Men 
52 athletes competed in the men's speed climbing event.

Women 
34 athletes competed in the women's speed climbing event.

Speed 15m

Men 
36 athletes competed in the men's speed climbing event.

Women 
23 athletes competed in the women's speed climbing event.

References 

IFSC Climbing World Championships
World Climbing Championships
International sports competitions hosted by China